Pterostylis alveata, commonly known as the coastal greenhood, is a species of orchid endemic to south-eastern Australia. As with similar greenhoods, the flowering plants differ from those which are not flowering. In this species, the non-flowering plants have a rosette of leaves flat on the ground but the flowering plants have a single small, shiny green and white flower with leaves on the flowering spike.

Description
Pterostylis alveata is a terrestrial, perennial, deciduous, herb with an underground tuber and when not flowering, a rosette of dark green leaves, each leaf 10–25 mm long and 5–15 mm wide. Flowering plants have a single flower 12–15 mm long and 7–10 mm wide borne on a spike 100–200 mm high with between three and five spreading stem leaves. The flowers are shiny green and white. The dorsal sepal and petals are fused, forming a hood or "galea" over the column. The dorsal sepal curves forward with a pointed tip.  The lateral sepals are held closely against the galea, have a thread-like tip 12–15 mm long and a flat, protruding sinus between their bases. The labellum is 8–9 mm long, 3 mm wide, dark brown and blunt, just visible above the sinus. Flowering occurs from May to June.

Taxonomy and naming
Pterostylis alveata was first formally described in 1939 by John ("Ros") Garnet from a specimen collected on Snake Island. The description was published in The Victorian Naturalist. The specific epithet (alveata) is a Latin word meaning "hollowed out".

Distribution and habitat
The coastal greenhood grows among grasses in moist coastal woodland and scrub between Melbourne in Victoria and Nelson Bay in New South Wales.

References

alveata
Endemic orchids of Australia
Orchids of New South Wales
Orchids of Victoria (Australia)
Plants described in 1939